Lamont Felt Toronto (February 21, 1914 – January 1971) was a Utah politician. He was Secretary of State of Utah from 1953 to 1963. He also served in the Utah state House of Representatives.

Toronto was a member of the Republican Party.  He served in the Utah Legislature in 1947.

Toronto was a member of the Church of Jesus Christ of Latter-day Saints (LDS Church), a grandson of Joseph Toronto and the brother of Wallace F. Toronto.  In 1914, Toronto married Helen Davidson (died 2009). From 1965 to 1968, Toronto served as president of the LDS Church's Canadian Mission, based in Toronto, Ontario. while presiding over the Canadian Mission Toronto also served on Canada's Centennial Planning Commission.

Notes

References 
 The Political Graveyard: Index to Politicians: Tooley to Tostofson
 Lamont Toronto entry in New Family Search

1914 births
1970 deaths
American leaders of the Church of Jesus Christ of Latter-day Saints
American Mormon missionaries in Canada
Republican Party members of the Utah House of Representatives
Mission presidents (LDS Church)
20th-century American politicians
Latter Day Saints from Utah
Place of birth missing
Place of death missing
Secretaries of State of Utah